The 1986 Florida State Seminole baseball team represented Florida State University in the 1986 NCAA Division I baseball season. The Seminoles played their home games at Seminole Stadium. The team was coached by Mike Martin in his 7th season at Florida State.

The Seminoles lost the College World Series, defeated by the Arizona Wildcats in the championship game.

Roster

Schedule 

! style="" | Regular season
|- valign="top" 

|- align="center" bgcolor="#ccffcc"
| February 12 ||  || Seminole Stadium • Tallahassee, FL || 10–1 || Loynd (1–0) || Foley (0–1) || 1,075 || 1–0 || –
|- align="center" bgcolor="#ccffcc"
| February 13 || Grambling State || Seminole Stadium • Tallahassee, FL || 20–6 || Kovensky (1–0) || Shaw (0–1) || 895 || 2–0 || –
|- align="center" bgcolor="#ffcccc"
| February 14 || Grambling State || Seminole Stadium • Tallahassee, FL || 1–3 || Williams (1–0) || Pollack (0–1) || 675 || 2–1 || –
|- align="center" bgcolor="#ccffcc"
| February 15 ||  || Seminole Stadium • Tallahassee, FL || 7–6 || Kovensky (2–0) || Guin (0–1) || 2,513 || 3–1 || 1–0
|- align="center" bgcolor="#ccffcc"
| February 15 || Southern Miss || Seminole Stadium • Tallahassee, FL || 2–0 || Lewis (1–0) || Lindsey (0–1) || 2,513 || 4–1 || 2–0
|- align="center" bgcolor="#ccffcc"
| February 16 || Southern Miss || Seminole Stadium • Tallahassee, FL || 14–6 || Loynd (2–0) || Wagner (0–1) || 2,103 || 5–1 || 3–0
|- align="center" bgcolor="#ccffcc"
| February 18 ||  || Seminole Stadium • Tallahassee, FL || 9–6 || Pollack (1–1) || Sims (0–1) || 845 || 6–1 || 3–0
|- align="center" bgcolor="#ccffcc"
| February 19 || Samford || Seminole Stadium • Tallahassee, FL || 9–1 || Little (1–0) || Wood (0–1) || 991 || 7–1 || 3–0
|- align="center" bgcolor="#ccffcc"
| February 22 ||  || Seminole Stadium • Tallahassee, FL || 6–4 || Lewis (2–0) || Brown (0–1) || 3,129 || 8–1 || 3–0
|- align="center" bgcolor="#ccffcc"
| February 23 || Georgia Tech || Seminole Stadium • Tallahassee, FL || 9–4 || Loynd (3–0) || Kinard (0–1) || 2,513 || 9–1 || 3–0
|- align="center" bgcolor="#ccffcc"
| February 25 || at  || Perry Field • Gainesville, FL || 10–6 || Little (2–0) || Gedamski (0–2) || 1,703 || 10–1 || 3–0
|- align="center" bgcolor="#ccffcc"
| February 26 || at Florida || Perry Field • Gainesville, FL || 10–7 || Lewis (3–0) || Sebree (1–1) || 1,550 || 11–1 || 3–0
|-

|- align="center" bgcolor="#ccffcc"
| March 1 ||  || Seminole Stadium • Tallahassee, FL || 9–3 || Kovensky (3–0) || Alexander (2–1) || 3,117 || 12–1 || 3–0
|- align="center" bgcolor="#ccffcc"
| March 2 || South Florida || Seminole Stadium • Tallahassee, FL || 8–7 || Kovensky (4–0) || Rose (3–1) || 2,965 || 13–1 || 3–0
|- align="center" bgcolor="#ccffcc"
| March 4 || at South Florida || Red McEwen Field • Tampa, FL || 9–8 || Lewis (4–0) || Fagnano (2–1) || 1,344 || 14–1 || 3–0
|- align="center" bgcolor="#ffcccc"
| March 5 || at South Florida || Red McEwen Field • Tampa, FL || 3–6 || Eiland (1–1) || Loynd (3–1) || 1,102 || 14–2 || 3–0
|- align="center" bgcolor="#ccffcc"
| March 8 ||  || Seminole Stadium • Tallahassee, FL || 9–3 || Little (3–0) || Ellis (1–2) || 2,213 || 15–2 || 3–0
|- align="center" bgcolor="#ccffcc"
| March 9 || FIU || Seminole Stadium • Tallahassee, FL || 12–10 || Lee (1–0) || Cook (1–1) || 1,903 || 16–2 || 3–0
|- align="center" bgcolor="#ccffcc"
| March 10 || Samford || Seminole Stadium • Tallahassee, FL || 19–2 || Loynd (4–1) || Silas (0–3) || 913 || 17–2 || 3–0
|- align="center" bgcolor="#ccffcc"
| March 11 || Samford || Seminole Stadium • Tallahassee, FL || 15–5 || Pollack (2–1) || Wood (0–2) || 1,031 || 18–2 || 3–0
|- align="center" bgcolor="#ccffcc"
| March 12 ||  || Seminole Stadium • Tallahassee, FL || 12–4 || Porcelli (1–0) || Walker (0–1) || 1,720 || 19–2 || 3–0
|- align="center" bgcolor="#ccffcc"
| March 13 || Richmond || Seminole Stadium • Tallahassee, FL || 14–4 || Little (4–0) || Richardson (1–2) || 712 || 20–2 || 3–0
|- align="center" bgcolor="#ccffcc"
| March 14 || Richmond || Seminole Stadium • Tallahassee, FL || 16–1 || Lewis (5–0) || Lowe (0–2) || 1,685 || 21–2 || 3–0
|- align="center" bgcolor="#ccffcc"
| March 15 || Richmond || Seminole Stadium • Tallahassee, FL || 13–3 || Loynd (5–1) || Walker (1–1) || 2,037 || 22–2 || 3–0
|- align="center" bgcolor="#ccffcc"
| March 17 ||  || Seminole Stadium • Tallahassee, FL || 7–0 || Pollack (3–1) || Schuster (0–1) || 1,877 || 23–2 || 3–0
|- align="center" bgcolor="#ccffcc"
| March 18 || Pittsburgh || Seminole Stadium • Tallahassee, FL || 10–2 || Little (5–0) || Gavran (0–1) || 1,811 || 24–2 || 3–0
|- align="center" bgcolor="#ccffcc"
| March 19 || Pittsburgh || Seminole Stadium • Tallahassee, FL || 22–1 || Lewis (6–0) || Craska (1–1) || 1,471 || 25–2 || 3–0
|- align="center" bgcolor="#ccffcc"
| March 20 || Pittsburgh || Seminole Stadium • Tallahassee, FL || 17–1 || Loynd (6–1) || Shannon (0–2) || 195 || 26–2 || 3–0
|- align="center" bgcolor="#ffcccc"
| March 22 || at Southern Miss || Pete Taylor Park • Hattiesburg, MS || 10–2 || Lindsey (3–3) || Little (5–1) || 820 || 26–3 || 3–1
|- align="center" bgcolor="#ccffcc"
| March 22 || at Southern Miss || Pete Taylor Park • Hattiesburg, MS || 2–0 || Pollack (4–1) || Willis (2–5) || 820 || 27–3 || 4–1
|- align="center" bgcolor="#ccffcc"
| March 23 || at Southern Miss || Pete Taylor Park • Hattiesburg, MS|| 13–9 || Porcelli (2–0) || Pourciau (0–2) || 937 || 28–3 || 5–1
|- align="center" bgcolor="#ffcccc"
| March 24 || at  || Eddie Stanky Field • Mobile, AL || 5–12 || Fuller (2–1) || Lewis (6–1) || 2,369 || 28–4 || 5–1
|- align="center" bgcolor="#ccffcc"
| March 25 || at South Alabama || Eddie Stanky Field • Mobile, AL || 13–4 || Loynd (7–1) || Rub (4–2) || 912 || 29–4 || 5–1
|- align="center" bgcolor="#ccffcc"
| March 26 || South Alabama || Seminole Stadium • Tallahassee, FL || 14–4 || Little (6–1) || Penry (2–2) || 2,298 || 30–4 || 5–1
|- align="center" bgcolor="#ccffcc"
| March 27 || South Alabama || Seminole Stadium • Tallahassee, FL || 13–9 || Lee (2–0) || Wilson (2–2) || 2,612 || 31–4 || 5–1
|- align="center" bgcolor="#ccffcc"
| March 29 || at  || Nat Buring Stadium • Memphis, TN || 7–3 || Loynd (8–1) || Gallo (3–3) || 515 || 32–4 || 6–1
|- align="center" bgcolor="#ccffcc"
| March 29 || at Memphis State || Nat Buring Stadium • Memphis, TN || 6–1 || Lewis (7–1) || Covington (3–1) || 515 || 33–4 || 7–1
|- align="center" bgcolor="#ffcccc"
| March 30 || at Memphis State || Nat Buring Stadium • Memphis, TN || 2–7 || Newcomb (4–1) || Little (6–2) || 317 || 33–5 || 7–2
|-

|- align="center" bgcolor="#ccffcc"
| April 1 ||  || Seminole Stadium • Tallahassee, FL || 15–12 || Pollack (5–1) || Novak (7–3) || 2,487 || 34–5 || 7–2
|- align="center" bgcolor="#ccffcc"
| April 2 || UCF || Seminole Stadium • Tallahassee, FL || 8–3 || Loynd (9–1) || Manion (6–4) || 1,379 || 35–5 || 7–2
|- align="center" bgcolor="#ccffcc"
| April 3 ||  || Seminole Stadium • Tallahassee, FL || 9–2 || Lewis (8–1) || Stanford (5–4) || 2,187 || 36–5 || 7–2
|- align="center" bgcolor="#ffcccc"
| April 4 || Jacksonville || Seminole Stadium • Tallahassee, FL || 11–10 || Miller (5–1) || Little (6–3) || 2,408 || 36–6 || 7–2
|- align="center" bgcolor="#ccffcc"
| April 5 ||  || Seminole Stadium • Tallahassee, FL || 7–5 || Pollack (6–1) || Herry (0–1) || 2,612 || 37–6 || 7–2
|- align="center" bgcolor="#ccffcc"
| April 6 || Tulane || Seminole Stadium • Tallahassee, FL || 4–2 || Little (10–1) || Borgatti (7–1) || 2,103 || 38–6 || 7–2
|- align="center" bgcolor="#ccffcc"
| April 8 || at Jacksonville || Unknown • Jacksonville, FL || 20–3 || Lewis (9–1) || Stanford (5–5) || 1,003 || 39–6 || 7–2
|- align="center" bgcolor="#ffcccc"
| April 9 || at Jacksonville || Unknown • Jacksonville, FL || 11–10 || DiRienzio (3–0) || Pollack (6–2) || 230 || 39–7 || 7–2
|- align="center" bgcolor="#ccffcc"
| April 11 || Miami (FL) || Seminole Stadium • Tallahassee, FL || 6–1 || Loynd (11–1) || Ryan (1–1) || 6,145 || 40–7 || 7–2
|- align="center" bgcolor="#ffcccc"
| April 12 || Miami (FL) || Seminole Stadium • Tallahassee, FL || 3–4 || Raether (5–1) || Lewis (9–2) || 4,893 || 40–8 || 7–2
|- align="center" bgcolor="#ccffcc"
| April 13 || Miami (FL) || Seminole Stadium • Tallahassee, FL || 8–3 || Pollack (7–2) || Meizoso (4–3) || 5,113 || 41–8 || 7–2
|- align="center" bgcolor="#ccffcc"
| April 15 || Florida || Seminole Stadium • Tallahassee, FL || 7–6 || Little (7–3) || Johnson (2–1) || 4,530 || 42–8 || 7–2
|- align="center" bgcolor="#ccffcc"
| April 16 || Florida || Seminole Stadium • Tallahassee, FL || 8–0 || Loynd (12–1) || Goodrich (2–2) || 3,322 || 43–8 || 7–2
|- align="center" bgcolor="#ccffcc"
| April 19 || Memphis State || Seminole Stadium • Tallahassee, FL || 6–0 || Pollack (8–2) || Newcomb (5–2) || 3,113 || 44–8 || 8–2
|- align="center" bgcolor="#ccffcc"
| April 19 || Memphis State || Seminole Stadium • Tallahassee, FL || 6–5 || Lewis (10–2) || Byrd (4–1) || 3,113 || 45–8 || 9–2
|- align="center" bgcolor="#ccffcc"
| April 20 || Memphis State || Seminole Stadium • Tallahassee, FL || 7–1 || Loynd (13–1) || Covington (4–2) || 2,127 || 46–8 || 10–2
|- align="center" bgcolor="#ccffcc"
| April 26 || at UCF || Unknown • Orlando, FL || 3–1 || Loynd (14–1) || Manion (8–5) || 4,206 || 47–8 || 10–2
|- align="center" bgcolor="#ccffcc"
| April 29 || at FIU || Unknown • Miami, FL || 12–0 || Little (8–3) || Cook (8–2) || 1,090 || 48–8 || 10–2
|-

|- align="center" bgcolor="#ffcccc"
| May 2 || at Miami (FL) || Mark Light Field • Miami, FL || 10–11 || Raether (6–1) || Kovensky (4–1) || 6,387 || 48–9 || 10–2
|- align="center" bgcolor="#ccffcc"
| May 3 || at Miami (FL) || Mark Light Field • Miami, FL || 14–6 || Loynd (15–1) || Meizoso (6–4) || 6,566 || 49–9 || 10–2
|- align="center" bgcolor="#ffcccc"
| May 4 || at Miami (FL) || Mark Light Field • Miami, FL || 5–7 || Davies (9–0) || Pollack (8–3) || 3,858 || 49–10 || 10–2
|- align="center" bgcolor="#ccffcc"
| May 19 ||  || Seminole Stadium • Tallahassee, FL || 6–4 || Porcelli (3–0) || Manuel (9–2) || 4,364 || 54–11 || 10–2
|-

|-
! style="" | Postseason
|-

|- align="center" bgcolor="#ccffcc"
| May 9 ||  || Seminole Stadium • Tallahassee, FL || 10–3 || Loynd (16–1) || Sala (3–7) || 3,751 || 50–10 || 10–2
|- align="center" bgcolor="#ffcccc"
| May 10 ||  || Seminole Stadium • Tallahassee, FL || 5–8 || Menhart (7–0) || Little (8–4) || 7,597 || 50–11 || 10–2
|- align="center" bgcolor="#ccffcc"
| May 10 || Memphis State || Seminole Stadium • Tallahassee, FL || 7–3 || Pollack (9–3) || Walker (2–1) || 7,597 || 51–11 || 10–2
|- align="center" bgcolor="#ccffcc"
| May 11 || South Carolina || Seminole Stadium • Tallahassee, FL || 3–0 || Loynd (17–1) || Reed (5–3) || 4,811 || 52–11 || 10–2
|- align="center" bgcolor="#ccffcc"
| May 12 || South Carolina || Seminole Stadium • Tallahassee, FL || 7–2 || Lewis (11–2) || Boley (5–3) || 4,811 || 53–11 || 10–2
|-

|- align="center" bgcolor="#ccffcc"
| May 22 ||  || Seminole Stadium • Tallahassee, FL || 10–3 || Loynd (18–1) || Grossman (17–4) || 3,709 || 55–11 || 10–2
|- align="center" bgcolor="#ccffcc"
| May 23 ||  || Seminole Stadium • Tallahassee, FL || 12–9 || Lewis (12–2) || Fry (11–5) || 3,907 || 56–11 || 10–2
|- align="center" bgcolor="#ccffcc"
| May 24 || South Florida || Seminole Stadium • Tallahassee, FL || 11–7 || Loynd (19–1) || Daughtery (7–1) || 5,160 || 57–11 || 10–2
|-

|- align="center" bgcolor="#ccffcc"
| May 31 || vs  || Rosenblatt Stadium • Omaha, NE || 5–3 || Loynd (20–1) || Quinzer (13–3) || 14,718 || 58–11 || 10–2
|- align="center" bgcolor="#ccffcc"
| June 3 || vs Miami (FL) || Rosenblatt Stadium • Omaha, NE || 7–2 || Lewis (13–2) || Davies (9–2) || 12,304 || 59–11 || 10–2
|- align="center" bgcolor="#ffcccc"
| June 6 || vs Arizona || Rosenblatt Stadium • Omaha, NE || 5–9 || Heredia (16–3) || Loynd (20–2) || 14,343 || 59–12 || 10–2
|- align="center" bgcolor="#ccffcc"
| June 7 || vs Oklahoma State || Rosenblatt Stadium • Omaha, NE || 9-5 || Lewis (14–2) || Lienhard (2–1) || 12,000 || 60–12 || 10–2
|- align="center" bgcolor="#ccffcc"
| June 8 || vs Miami (FL) || Rosenblatt Stadium • Omaha, NE || 4–3 || Little (9–4) || Davies (9–3) || 11,580 || 61–12 || 10–2
|- align="center" bgcolor="#ffcccc"
| June 9 || vs Arizona || Rosenblatt Stadium • Omaha, NE || 10–2 || Alexander (8–2) || Loynd (20–3) || 12,659 || 61–13 || 10–2
|-

Awards and honors 
Mike Loynd
 Golden Spikes Award
 ABCA 1st Team All-American
 Baseball America 1st Team All-American
 South II Regional All-Tournament Team
 Baseball America Pitcher of the Year
 All-Metro Tournament Team
 Metro Tournament MVP
 All-Metro Conference Team

Luis Alicea
 Baseball America 1st Team All-American
 ABCA 2nd Team All-American
 Sporting News All-American
 All-Tournament Team
 South II Regional All-Tournament Team
 South II Regional Tournament MVP
 All-Metro Tournament Team
 All-Metro Conference Team

Richie Lewis
 Baseball America 1st Team All-American
 All-Tournament Team
 South II Regional All-Tournament Team
 All-Metro Conference Team

Paul Sorrento
 Baseball America 2nd Team All-American
 All-Tournament Team
 South II Regional All-Tournament Team
 All-Metro Tournament Team
 All-Metro Conference Team

Jose Marzan
 All-Metro Conference Team

Bien Figueroa
 All-Tournament Team

Seminoles in the 1986 MLB Draft 
The following members of the Florida State Seminoles baseball program were drafted in the 1986 Major League Baseball Draft.

References 

Florida State Seminoles baseball seasons
College World Series seasons
Florida State Seminoles
Florida State